Ayelet HaShahar is a kibbutz in northern Israel acquired in 1892 and settled in the second Aliyah, located on the Korazim Plateau, by the Rosh Pina – Metulla road, it is approximately  south of Kiryat Shmona and falls under the jurisdiction of Upper Galilee Regional Council. Named after the introduction of Psalm 22, and means "hind of the dawn".

History
The name of the kibbutz, literally "hind of the dawn", is taken from the first line of Psalm 22 in reference to Najmat es-Subh, the original name of the land on which the kibbutz is located. The land was bought by the Jewish Colonization Association in 1892, and first settled by immigrants from Europe in 1915 during the Second Aliyah period. A census conducted in 1922 by the British Mandate authorities, recorded a population of 78 Jews. During the end of the British mandate, the kibbutz was the staging ground for Palmach operations: Night of the Bridges and the bombing of the Yarmuk Bridge (16–17 June 1946).

After the 1947–1949 Palestine war, Ayelet HaShahar took over the land from the newly depopulated Palestinian village of Yarda.

Economy
Ayelet HaShahar is one of the larger fruit producers in Israel. They also raise dairy cattle and poultry, and manage beehives (the kibbutz is a major producer of Israel's honey). There are fish ponds, which take water from canals that drain the nearby Hula Valley swamps.

Landmarks
Tel Hazor, the capital of Canaanite Galilee, lies opposite the kibbutz. The Archaeological Museum of Hatzor is located at the kibbutz. Antiquities from Tel Hazor are displayed, but many of the original artifacts are actually at the Israel Museum in Jerusalem.

Notable people
 Tzruya Lahav, songwriter, singer, and novelist
 Avshalom Okashi, artist

References

Bibliography

External links
Kibbutz website 
What's happening to the kibbutz? article written by Ellis Shuman, June 16, 2004, mentions the vote by members of Kibbutz Ayelet Hashahar to transform their cooperative into a moshav.
Mevo HaGalil Elementary School

Kibbutzim
Kibbutz Movement
Populated places established in 1915
1915 establishments in the Ottoman Empire
Populated places in Northern District (Israel)
Jewish villages in the Ottoman Empire
1910s establishments in Ottoman Syria